Isla El Muerto is an island in the Gulf of California east of the Baja California Peninsula. The island is uninhabited and is part of San Felipe Municipality.

Biology
Isla El Muerto has eight species of reptile, including two endemic species/subspecies, Crotalus muertensis (Isla El Muerto rattlesnake) and Uta lowei (dead side-blotched lizard). There are no amphibians.

References

Islands of Baja California
Uninhabited islands of Mexico